Reza de Wet (11 May 1952 – 27 January 2012) was a South African playwright.

Reza de Wet, born in a small town named Senekal in Free State, South Africa is considered one of the country’s greatest female playwrights. After graduating from University of Cape Town drama school, she worked extensively as an actress, obtained a master's degree in English Literature and lectured in the drama department of Rhodes University in Grahamstown.

She was a prolific, and socially conscious writer who had written 12 plays in 15 years (five in English and seven in Afrikaans). She won nine awards for her scripts (five Vita Awards, three Fleur du Cap Awards and a Dalro Award) as well as literary awards (a CNA Prize, a Rapport Prize and twice the Herzog Prize) and productions of her plays have won more than 40 theatre awards. Yelena won the Vita Award for Best Script (1998–1999) while "Drie Susters Twee" (Three Sisters part two), was named Best Production for the same year.

She won more theatre and literary awards than any other South African playwright, including the Herzog Prize for drama (1994), the highest honour in Afrikaans literature. In Open Space, an anthology of new African plays, she is the only woman represented and one of the two South African dramatists.

A feature film based on Diepe Grond (African Gothic) was adapted for the screen and produced by Damon Shalit. Damon played the role of Frikkie and Chella Ferrow the role of Sussie. The film was directed by Gabriel Bologna in 2012.  In 2013, the film was screened in KwaZulu-Natal, South Africa, where Reza De Wet lived, to commemorate the anniversary of her death.

She died from leukaemia at her home on 27 January 2012.

References

External links
http://www.timeslive.co.za/opinion/commentary/2012/02/05/obituary-reza-de-wet-playwright-who-sought-hidden-truths
http://www.tandfonline.com/doi/abs/10.1080/10137548.2012.754082#.UrHWVtJdXIc

South African dramatists and playwrights
1952 births
2012 deaths
Sestigers
Afrikaner people
Afrikaans-language writers
Translators from English
Hertzog Prize winners for drama
Hertzog Prize winners for prose
20th-century South African novelists
21st-century South African novelists
20th-century translators